The Philippines Free Press is a weekly English language news magazine which was founded in 1908, which makes it the Philippines' oldest weekly English language periodical currently still in print.  It is known for being one of the few publications that dared to criticize the administration of Ferdinand Marcos in the years before the declaration of Martial Law, and for being one of the first publications shuttered once Martial Law was put into effect. It has been revived after Marcos was ousted. The magazine was known for featuring the outstanding legislators every year. Only Jose W. Diokno has held the title for four consecutive years, which is the most in the magazine's award giving history.

Juan dela Cruz, the male national personification of the Philippines and counterpart to Maria dela Cruz, first appeared in this magazine in 1946.

References 

Magazines published in Metro Manila
Weekly magazines
Magazines published in the Philippines